In Greek mythology, Hesione (Ancient Greek: Ἡσιόνη) was the daughter of Titan Oceanus probably by his sister-wife Tethys, and thus counted among the Oceanids. She was the wife of her cousin Prometheus and the mother of Deucalion. That she was a daughter of Oceanus and wife of Prometheus, was also repeated in Aeschylus' Prometheus Bound.

Notes

References
 Aeschylus (?), Prometheus Bound in Aeschylus, with an English translation by Herbert Weir Smyth, Ph. D. in two volumes. Vol 2. Cambridge, MA. Harvard University Press. 1926. Online version at the Perseus Digital Library.
 Fowler, R. L. (2000), Early Greek Mythography: Volume 1: Text and Introduction, Oxford University Press, 2000. .
 Fowler, R. L. (2013), Early Greek Mythography: Volume 2: Commentary, Oxford University Press, 2013. .
 Freeman, Kathleen, Ancilla to the Pre-Socratic Philosophers: A Complete Translation of the Fragments in Diels, Fragmente Der Vorsokratiker, Harvard University Press, 1983. .

Oceanids